Delvinë District (Albanian: Rrethi i Delvinës) was one of the 36 districts of Albania, which were dissolved in July 2000 and replaced by 12 counties. Its population included a substantial Greek community. The district is in the south of the country, and its capital was the town of Delvinë. Its territory is now part of Vlorë County: the municipalities of Delvinë and Finiq (partly).

Administrative divisions
The district consisted of the following municipalities:

Delvinë
Vergo
Finiq
Mesopotam

Note: - urban municipalities in bold

References

Further reading

Districts of Albania
Geography of Vlorë County